Harvest for the World is the fourteenth studio album released by The Isley Brothers on their T-Neck imprint on May 29, 1976.

The album was remastered and expanded for inclusion in the 2015 released CD box set The RCA Victor & T-Neck Album Masters, 1959–1983.

Reception

The album included the successful socially conscious title track and the top three R&B record, "Who Loves You Better?" While not released as singles, the ballads "(At Your Best) You Are Love" and "Let Me Down Easy" were also hits. The album sold over 500,000 copies in the first three weeks of release, making it one of the fastest-selling records ever (it passed the million sales mark in the early 2000s).  It topped the Billboard R&B Albums chart; the Isleys third straight album to do so.

Track listing
Unless otherwise noted, Information is based on Liner notes

Personnel
Performance
 Ronald Isley –  lead vocals (1-8, except 6)
 O'Kelly Isley Jr. background vocals (Lead vocal on 6)
 Rudolph Isley background vocals
 Ernie Isley –  congas, other percussion (2, 5), timbales, maracas, electric guitar, six-string acoustic guitar, 12-string acoustic guitar, drums, background vocals
 Marvin Isley –  bass, cowbell, percussion, background vocals
 Chris Jasper –  tambourine, other percussion (2, 5), acoustic piano, electric piano, ARP synthesizer, clavinet, background vocals

Production 
The Isley Brothers - producers
Malcolm Cecil - recording engineer (1-8), producer, music programming 
John Holbrook - live recording engineer (9)

Later samples and covers
Later Samples
Paul Johnson sampled "Harvest for the World" for his song “4 the World”, from the 1995 album Bump Talkin’
Mo Kolours also sampled "Harvest for the World" for his song “Harvest”, which first appeared on the 2015 album Texture Like Sun
Tracey Lee sampled "Let Me Down Easy" on his song “On the Edge”, from the 1997 album Many Facez
Devin the Dude also reused "Let Me Down Easy" on the song “I Can’t Handle It”, from his 2010 album Suite 420
Sevyn Streeter sampled the song on the track "Before I Do" from her 2017 debut album Girl Disrupted.
Cover Versions 
 Power Station covered "Harvest for the World" on their album The Power Station in 1985.
 The Christians covered "Harvest for the World" in 1988.  The song reached #8 in the UK Singles chart
 Ronnie Laws first recorded the song "Harvest for the World" with the Isley Brothers themselves for his 1992 album Deep Soul, then later covered the entire album of "Harvest for the World" titled Portrait of the Isley Brothers' Harvest for the World in 1998.
 Aaliyah covered "(At Your Best) You Are Love" on her album Age Ain't Nothing but a Number in 1994.
 Jewell covered "Harvest for the World" on the soundtrack album Murder Was the Case in 1994. 
 Christine Collister covered "Harvest for the World" on her album Blue Aconite in 1996.
 Mike Francis covered "Harvest for the World" in both English and Italian.  The Italian version, known as "Il Mio Amore Libero per Te", first appeared on his 1998 album Misteria.
 Vanessa Williams covered "Harvest for the World" on her album Everlasting Love in 2005.
 Frank Ocean covered “At Your Best (You Are Love)” in early 2015, later appearing on his 2016 video album Endless.
 Sinéad Harnett covered “At Your Best (You Are Love)” on the deluxe release of her album Ready Is Always Too Late in 2022.

Charts

Singles

See also
 List of number-one R&B albums of 1976 (U.S.)

External links
 The Isley Brothers-Harvest For The World at Discogs

References

1976 albums
The Isley Brothers albums
T-Neck Records albums